Heteromicta sordidella is a species of snout moth in the genus Heteromicta. It was described by Francis Walker in 1866. It is found in Australia (including Western Australia and New South Wales).

References

Moths described in 1866
Tirathabini